Kwon Soon-woo was the defending champion but chose not to defend his title.

Andreas Seppi won the title after defeating Liam Broady 6–2, 6–1 in the final.

Seeds

Draw

Finals

Top half

Bottom half

References

External links
Main draw
Qualifying draw

Biella Challenger Indoor III - 1